Daniel Joseph Riordan (July 7, 1870 – April 28, 1923) was a U.S. Representative from New York for one term from 1899 to 1901 and for eight additional terms from 1906 to 1923.

He was a Democrat and a member of Tammany Hall.

Biography 
Riordan was born in New York City and attended public schools until 1886, when he entered Manhattan College, from which he graduated in 1890. He engaged in the real-estate business.

Political career 
Riordan was elected as a Democrat to the 56th United States Congress, holding office from March 4, 1899, to March 3, 1901. He was a member of the New York State Senate (10th D.) from 1903 to 1906, sitting in the 126th, 127th, 128th and 129th New York State Legislatures.

Riordan was elected to the 59th United States Congress to fill the vacancy caused by the resignation of Timothy D. Sullivan and on the same day was elected to the 60th United States Congress. He was re-elected to the 61st and to the seven succeeding Congresses, holding office from November 6, 1906, until his death in Washington, D.C. on April 28, 1923.

Burial 
He was buried at the Calvary Cemetery in Queens.

See also
List of United States Congress members who died in office (1900–49)

References

External links

1870 births
1923 deaths
Burials at Calvary Cemetery (Queens)
Manhattan College alumni
Democratic Party New York (state) state senators
Politicians from New York City
Democratic Party members of the United States House of Representatives from New York (state)
Catholics from New York (state)